There have been four baronetcies for persons with the surname Blake, one in the Baronetage of Ireland, two in the Baronetage of Great Britain and one in the Baronetage of the United Kingdom. Two of the creations are extant as of 2010.

The Blake Baronetcy, of Menlough in the County of Galway, was created in the Baronetage of Ireland on 10 July 1622 for Valentine Blake, Mayor of Galway in 1611 and 1630 and a member of the Irish House of Commons for Galway. His grandfather Thomas Blake (died 1574) had preceded him as Mayor. The second Baronet was a member of the Irish Parliament for Galway Borough. The third Baronet represented both County Galway and Galway Borough in Parliament. The sixth Baronet was a member of the Irish House of Commons for County Galway. He was the first Catholic gentlemen of distinction to join William of Orange. The twelfth Baronet represented Galway Borough in the British House of Commons. The fourteenth Baronet was high sheriff of County Galway in 1872. See also the Blake Baronetcy of Twizell Castle below.

The Blake Baronetcy, of Langham in the County of Suffolk, was created in the Baronetage of Great Britain on 8 October 1772 for Patrick Blake, Member of Parliament for Sudbury. The title became extinct on the death of the sixth Baronet in 1975.

The Blake Baronetcy, of Twizell Castle in the County of Durham, was created in the Baronetage of Great Britain on 25 May 1774 for Francis Blake. He was the great-grandson of Robert Blake, Mayor of Galway in 1547, brother of the first Baronet of Menlough (see above). Sir Francis's mother was Sarah, eldest daughter of Sir Francis Blake, of Cogges, Oxfordshire, who married Elizabeth (née Carr) of Ford Castle, Northumberland, and purchased Twizell Castle, also in Northumberland, in 1685. Sir Francis was a distant relative of the Blake baronets of Menlough. The first Baronet's grandson, the third Baronet, sat as Member of Parliament for Berwick-upon-Tweed. The title became extinct on the latter's death in 1860.

The Blake Baronetcy, of Tillmouth Park in Cornhill in the County of Northumberland, was created in the Baronetage of the United Kingdom on 22 July 1907 for Francis Blake, subsequently Member of Parliament for Berwick-upon-Tweed. He was the son of Francis Blake, who had inherited Twizell and Tillmouth estates on the death of his relative, Sir Francis Blake, 3rd Baronet (see the 1774 creation above). As of 2010 the title is held by the first Baronet's grandson, the third Baronet, who succeeded his father in 1950.

Blake baronets, of Menlough (1622)

Sir Valentine Blake, 1st Baronet (died 1635)
Sir Thomas Blake, 2nd Baronet (died c. 1640)
Sir Valentine Blake, 3rd Baronet (died 1652)
Sir Thomas Blake, 4th Baronet (died c. 1670)
Sir Valentine Blake, 5th Baronet (died c. 1672)
Sir Walter Blake, 6th Baronet (died 1748)
Sir Thomas Blake, 7th Baronet (died 1749)
Sir Ulick Blake, 8th Baronet (died 1766)
Sir Thomas Blake, 9th Baronet (died 1787)
Sir Walter Blake, 10th Baronet (died 1802)
Sir John Blake, 11th Baronet (1753–1834)
Sir Valentine John Blake, 12th Baronet (1780–1847)
Sir Thomas Edward Blake, 13th Baronet (1805–1875)
Sir Valentine Blake, 14th Baronet (1836–1912), owned Menlough Castle. His daughter, Eleanor, was killed in a fire in the castle two years before his death.
Sir Thomas Patrick Ulick John Harvey Blake, 15th Baronet (1870–1925)
Sir Ulick Temple Blake, 16th Baronet (1904–1963), found dead in his car after inheriting Menlough Castle from the fourteenth baronet.
Sir Thomas Richard Valentine Blake, 17th Baronet (1942–2008), last of the 11th Baronet's male line.
Sir Anthony Teilo Bruce Blake, 18th Baronet (1951–2014), great-great-great-great grandson of the 10th Baronet through his 2nd son, Dominck Joseph Blake (1754–1843).
Sir Charles Valentine Bruce Blake, 19th baronet (born 1994).

Blake baronets, of Langham (1772)
Sir Patrick Blake, 1st Baronet (–1784)
Sir Patrick Blake, 2nd Baronet (c. 1768–1818)
Sir James Henry Blake, 3rd Baronet (1770–1832)
Sir Henry Charles Blake, 4th Baronet (1794–1880)
Sir Patrick James Graham Blake, 5th Baronet (1861–1930)
Sir Cuthbert Patrick Blake, 6th Baronet (1885–1975)

Blake baronets, of Twizell Castle (1774)
Sir Francis Blake, 1st Baronet (c. 1709–1780)
Sir Francis Blake, 2nd Baronet (c. 1737–1818)
Sir Francis Blake, 3rd Baronet (c. 1774–1860)

Blake baronets, of Tillmouth Park (1907) 
Sir Francis Douglas Blake, 1st Baronet (1856–1940)
Sir (Francis) Edward Colquhoun Blake, 2nd Baronet (1893–1950)
Sir Francis Michael Blake, 3rd Baronet (born 1943)

The heir apparent to the baronetcy is Francis Julian Blake (born 1971), eldest son of the 3rd Baronet.

References
Townend, Peter (ed.) Burke's Peerage (103rd Edition) (1963 edition). Burke's Peerage Limited, page 252.
Kidd, Charles, Williamson, David (editors). Debrett's Peerage and Baronetage (1990 edition). New York: St Martin's Press, 1990, 

History and Antiquities of North Durham (1852) Rev James Raine MA, page 316.

Baronetcies in the Baronetage of Ireland
Baronetcies in the Baronetage of the United Kingdom
Extinct baronetcies in the Baronetage of Great Britain
1622 establishments in Ireland
1772 establishments in Great Britain
1907 establishments in the United Kingdom